In molecular biology, P73 antisense RNA 1T (non-protein coding), also known as TP73-AS1 or PDAM, is a long non-coding RNA. It may regulate apoptosis via regulation of p53-dependent anti-apoptotic genes. It may play a role in the development of oligodendroglial tumours.

References

Further reading 
 

Non-coding RNA